Echigo Plain or Niigata Plain is an alluvial plain that extends from central to northern Niigata Prefecture in Japan. The area of the plain is approximately 2000km. It is the largest rice-growing area in Japan. The plain was formed by the Agano and Shinano rivers.

References 

Plains of Japan
Landforms of Niigata Prefecture